Royal LePage is a Canadian real estate franchiser and owner-operator with more than 650 locations and over 20,000 Realtors in Canada.  The company was founded on July 2, 1913 in Toronto, Canada by then 26-year-old Albert E. LePage, under the name "A.E. LePage, Bungalow Specialist." In 1984, the company was renamed Royal LePage following a merger with Royal Trust's real estate brokerage business.

Today, the company is led by Phil Soper, who was named president of Royal LePage in 2002 and chief executive officer in 2004. Royal LePage is a Bridgemarq Real Estate Services company, a TSX-listed corporation trading under the symbol TSX:BRE.

History

Albert E. LePage established his real estate company ‘A.E. LePage – The Bungalow Specialist’ on July 2, 1913.

In 1920, A.E. LePage assisted in founding the Toronto Real Estate Board with an eye to establishing codes of ethical practice for the industry.

Following A.E. LePage's retirement in 1953 the company, under new ownership, assembled 800 hectares of farmland, creating North America's first planned development, in the town of Don Mills in Ontario.

In 1964 the company offers a new service to help companies across Canada with employee relocations. (The service now operates as BGRS.)

In 1960 The A.E. LePage company plays a pivotal role in the land assembly and office leasing of the Toronto-Dominion Centre, the largest project of its time within the British Commonwealth.

In 1970, A.E. LePage rapidly expands its residential business through more than 140 acquisitions across Canada.

1974 The Survey of Canadian House Prices, later known as the Royal LePage House Price Survey, is launched.

A.E. LePage and Royal Trust merge in 1984 creating the country's leading diversified real estate services organization. The new company is named Royal LePage.

Royal LePage became a publicly-traded company in 1987, trading on the Toronto, Vancouver and Montreal stock exchanges.

Starting in 1994 Royal LePage offers a franchise system

Royal LePage launched www.royallepage.ca in 1995, Canada's first national Real Estate portal.

In 1998 the Royal LePage Shelter Foundation launched, creating the only corporately-branded charity within the Canadian real estate industry.

Royal LePage Franchise Services Fund listed on the Toronto Stock Exchange (TSX) in 2003. That year, Royal LePage acquired Le Groupe Trans-Action.

Royal LePage re-launched its Commercial division in April 2012 as Royal LePage Commercial and added www.royallepagecommercial.com to its online websites.

Executive Team
The following are the key leaders of Royal LePage as of December 2020:

 Phil Soper (President & CEO)
 Glen McMillan (Chief Financial Officer)
 Karen Yolevski (Chief Operating Officer)
 Sandra Webb (SVP, Marketing and Communications) 
 Norman Hertzman (VP, Business Development)
 Yvonne Ratigan (VP, Network Service)

Royal LePage Shelter Foundation

The Royal LePage Shelter Foundation is Canada's largest public foundation dedicated exclusively to supporting women's shelters and ending violence against women and children. The Royal LePage Shelter Foundation also supports long-term violence prevention and education programs. All funds raised by Royal LePage offices remain in their local community and because Royal LePage pays the costs of administration, one hundred percent of all money and effort goes to the charity.

References

External links
 Royal LePage Canada, corporate web-site

Real estate companies of Canada
Real estate services companies
Companies based in North York
Canadian brands